Brigadier Timothy William Hackworth (17 January 1933 – 29 September 2017), OBE, was a soldier in the British Army, an engineer, and a mathematician.

In Korea, Hackworth was the British defence attache in Seoul, commander of the Commonwealth Liaison Mission to the United Nations Command Korea, and Commonwealth member of the United Nations Military Armistice Commission. Later, Hackworth was a military knight of Windsor.

References

1933 births
2017 deaths
English mathematicians
Tim
Members of the Order of the British Empire
Military Knights of Windsor
Royal Corps of Signals officers
Alumni of Birkbeck, University of London